J. N. Jayashree is a whistle blower from India, a housewife who reported on corruption in Karnataka state and created a wiki to protect her husband, M. N. Vijayakumar, a worker employed by the state, The latter had accused government officials of taking bribes and kickbacks and engaging in "garden-variety pilferage." The wiki was created to generate awareness:  Jayashree said she didn't want her husband to end up like Shanmughan Manjunath or Satyendra Dubey,  who were found dead after they reported on corruption in a public company and a government department, respectively.

References

External links
 Fight Corruption Wiki created by Jayashree
 Podbharti podcast featuring an interview with Jayashree (in Hindi).

Indian whistleblowers
Living people
Activists from Karnataka
Women from Karnataka
Indian women activists
Year of birth missing (living people)